Hòn Đất is a rural district (huyện) of Kiên Giang province in the Mekong Delta region of Vietnam.

Divisions
The district is divided into the following communes:

 Hòn Đất
 Sóc Sơn
 Bình Giang
 Bình Sơn
 Lình Huỳnh
 Mỹ Hiệp Sơn
 Mỹ Lâm
 Mỹ Phước
 Mỹ Thái
 Mỹ Thuận
 Nam Thái Sơn
 Sơn Bình
 Sơn Kiên
 Thổ Sơn

As of 2003 the district had a population of 154,431. The district covers an area of 1028 km². The district capital lies at Hòn Đất.

References

Districts of Kiên Giang province